Selvena N. Brooks-Powers (born March 1, 1983) is an American politician and community organizer serving as a member of the New York City Council from the 31st district. She assumed office on March 19, 2021.

Early life and education 
Brooks-Powers was raised in Queens, New York City. She earned a Bachelor of Arts degree in sociology from Wilberforce University and a Master of Science in global affairs from New York University.

Career 
Brooks-Powers began her career as a staffer to Democratic members of the New York State Senate. She later worked on Dennis Herrera's campaign for mayor of San Francisco. In 2012 and 2013, she worked as a communications specialist for the Service Employees International Union. She also worked as a press officer in the office of the New York City Comptroller. Brooks-Powers has since worked as an independent political consultant. She was elected to the New York City Council on March 19, 2021.

References 

African-American New York City Council members
Living people
Place of birth missing (living people)
People from Rockaway, Queens
Wilberforce University alumni
New York University alumni
New York (state) Democrats
New York City Council members
21st-century American politicians
21st-century African-American politicians
1983 births
Women New York City Council members
21st-century American women politicians